John Crawford Crosby (June 15, 1859 – October 14, 1943) was an American politician from the U.S. state of Massachusetts.

Crosby was born in Sheffield, Massachusetts. He attended the public schools of Pittsfield and graduated from Eastman Business College in Poughkeepsie, New York and from Boston University School of Law in Boston.

Crosby was admitted to the bar in 1882 and began practice in Pittsfield. He began his political career as a member of the school committee of Pittsfield from 1884 to 1890. During the later part of his service on the school committee, Crosby also served in the Massachusetts House of Representatives (1886–1887) and the Massachusetts Senate (1888–1889).

Crosby served as the director of a bank and later of fire and life insurance companies. He was elected in the 1890 election as a Democrat to the U.S. House of Representatives, representing Massachusetts's 12th district for the 52nd United States Congress (1891-03-04 to 1893-03-03).

Crosby lost his campaign for reelection in the 1892 election. He was elected Mayor of Pittsfield, serving from 1894 to 1895, and was a delegate to the 1896 Democratic National Convention.

Crosby was city solicitor from 1896 to 1900 and appointed a justice of the superior court on January 25, 1905, serving until December 31, 1913, when he was appointed justice of the Massachusetts Supreme Judicial Court. Crosby served on the court until his retirement on October 1, 1937. He died in Pittsfield on October 14, 1943, and was interred at Pittsfield Cemetery.

See also
 110th Massachusetts General Court (1889)

References

 
 

1859 births
1943 deaths
Boston University School of Law alumni
Democratic Party Massachusetts state senators
Justices of the Massachusetts Supreme Judicial Court
Democratic Party members of the Massachusetts House of Representatives
School board members in Massachusetts
Mayors of Pittsfield, Massachusetts
1896 United States presidential election
Democratic Party members of the United States House of Representatives from Massachusetts